Mali Gradac  is a village in central Croatia, in the municipality of Glina, Sisak-Moslavina County.

Demographics
According to the 2011 census, the village of Mali Gradac has 143 inhabitants. This represents 36.57% of its pre-war population according to the 1991 census.

Population by ethnicity 
 

{{Kretanje broja stanovnika
 |naslov  = 'Historical population 1857-2011 
 |dimx    = 550
 |dimy    = 500
 |stanmax = 1600
 |crta1   = 100
 |crta2   = 50
 |a1      = 1857
 |a2      = 1869
 |a3      = 1880
 |a4      = 1890
 |a5      = 1900
 |a6      = 1910
 |a7      = 1921
 |a8      = 1931
 |a9      = 1948
 |a10     = 1953
 |a11     = 1961
 |a12     = 1971
 |a13     = 1981
 |a14     = 1991
 |a15     = 2001
 |a16     = 2011
 |p1      = 1078
 |p2      = 1330
 |p3      = 1282
 |p4      = 1553
 |p5      = 739
 |p6      = 878
 |p7      = 596
 |p8      = 820
 |p9      = 689
 |p10     = 680
 |p11     = 644
 |p12     = 570
 |p13     = 442
 |p14     = 391
 |p15     = 166
 |p16     = 143
 |izvor   = Croatian Bureau of Statistics
 }}

 Culture 

Local branch of SKD Prosvjeta Mali Gradac.

Sights and events
 Susreti na Baniji'' - one-day folklore festival founded in 2003 and hosted by the local branch of SKD Prosvjeta Mali Gradac. The event takes place on the last Saturday of July and brings together amateur groups nurturing traditional folk dancing and singing from different parts of Croatia, Serbia and Bosnia and Herzegovina.

Notable people 
Duško Gruborović, writer and actor
Momčilo Krković, sculptor

References

External links

Populated places in Sisak-Moslavina County
Serb communities in Croatia
Glina, Croatia